Løgstrup is a town in Viborg Municipality, Denmark.

References

Cities and towns in the Central Denmark Region
Viborg Municipality